The Adelaide Rush is a women's ice hockey team in the Australian Women's Ice Hockey League, which is the highest level national competition in Australia. The team is based in Adelaide, South Australia, Australia.

History

Before the AWIHL
The Adelaide Assassins were one of the four founding teams in the Australian Women's Ice Hockey League, which officially began in 2007 after two showcase season were held previously.

As the Assassins, Adelaide won both the 2005–06 Showcase Series and the 2006–07 Showcase Series.

AWIHL
The newly formed Australian Women's Ice Hockey League had its inaugural season in the 2007–08 season, where the Adelaide Assassins would again win the championship. At this time the championship trophy awarded to the winners of the finals was the West Lakes Trophy, made by Westlakes Trophies and Framing.

On August 8, 2011, the Adelaide Assassins merged with the Adelaide Adrenaline ice hockey club. The move was made to increase the exposure of women's hockey in Australia with the help of associating with an already well known brand with which they could share resources with.

Before the 2016 season began, the Adrenaline were re branded as Adelaide Rush.

Logo and uniform

2005–2009 Adelaide Assassins
In their first year, and the first Showcase Series that lead to the inaugural AWIHL season, the Adelaide Assassins wore a predominantly red uniform with black and red stripes.

2010–2015 Adelaide Adrenaline
On August 8, 2011, the Adelaide Assassins merged with the Adelaide Adrenaline ice hockey club and would use the same logo and a red variant of the AIHL team.

Season by season results

Players

Current roster
For the 2016–17 AWIHL season:

Captains
 2010–11 Candice Mitchell (C)
 2013–14 Candice Mitchell (C), Bethanie Kavanagh (A), Sari Lehmann (A)
 2014–15 Candice Mitchell (C), Bethanie Kavanagh (A), Sari Lehmann (A)
 2015–16 Candice Mitchell (C), Bethanie Kavanagh (A), Kate Tihema (A)
 2016–17 Sari Lehmann (C), Kelly Harris (A), Tess Reynolds (A), Kirsty Venus (A)

Head coaches
 2013–14 Josef Rezek
 2014–15 Josef Rezek
 2015–16 Josef Rezek
 2016–17 Mitch Kelleher
 2018–19 Jamie Holland
 2019–20 Hayden Crafter
 2020–20 Joey McDougall

See also

Ice Hockey Australia
Joan McKowen Memorial Trophy
Australian Ice Hockey League
Australian Junior Ice Hockey League
Jim Brown Trophy
Goodall Cup

References

External links 
Australian Women's Hockey League official site
Adelaide Rush official site
Brisbane Goannas official site
Melbourne Ice official Site 
Sydney Sirens official Site

Women's ice hockey in Australia
Ice hockey clubs established in 2005
Sporting clubs in Adelaide
2005 establishments in Australia
Ice hockey teams in Australia
Women's sports teams in Australia
Women's ice hockey teams
Australian Women's Ice Hockey League